The Very Best of Yanni is a compilation album by Greek keyboardist and composer Yanni, released on the Private Music label in 2000 (see 2000 in music). The album peaked at #3 on Billboard's "Top New Age Albums" chart in the same year.

Background
The compilation includes popular songs from his early albums including, Dare to Dream, In My Time, Keys to Imagination, Reflections of Passion, Out of Silence and Niki Nana.

Track listing

Production
All songs written by Yanni except track 1 written by Yanni and Malcolm McLaren
Compilation produced by Paul Williams for House of Hits Production, Ltd.
Digitally Remastered by Bill Lacey at Digital Sound & Picture, NY
Compiled by Sheila Volpe
Sequence by Buzz Ravineau
Photography: Lynn Goldsmith
Art Direction and Design: JRJ Associates Inc.
Special thanks to Mario Augusta and Debbie Eisen
Produced by Yanni except tracks 4, 5, 7, 10, 12, 13 and 15 produced by Peter Baumann and Yanni

(Personnel as described in CD liner notes.)

References

External links
Official Website

Yanni albums
2000 compilation albums